is a railway station on the two lines of the Osaka Metro.  The station is in Nishi-ku, Osaka, Japan.

Lines

 (Station Number: C15)
 (Station Number: S13)

Layout
There are two side platforms with two tracks for the Chuo Line on the first basement and two side platforms with two tracks for the Sennichimae Line on the second basement.  Passages are located between the west of platforms for the Chuo Line and the south of platforms for the Sennichimae Line.

Chuo Line

Sennichimae Line

References

Railway stations in Osaka Prefecture
Railway stations in Japan opened in 1964
Osaka Metro stations